The 1981 Prix de l'Arc de Triomphe was a horse race held at Longchamp on Sunday 4 October 1981. It was the 60th running of the Prix de l'Arc de Triomphe.

The winner was Gold River, a four-year-old filly trained in France by Alec Head and ridden by Gary Moore. The filly won by three quarters of a length and a nose from Bikala and April Run in a time of 2:35.2.

Race details
 Sponsor: none
 Purse: 
 Going: Dead
 Distance: 2,400 metres
 Number of runners: 24
 Winner's time: 2:35.2

Full result

* Abbreviations: shd = short-head; nk = neck

Winner's details
Further details of the winner, Detroit.
 Sex: Filly
 Foaled: 11 January 1977
 Country: France
 Sire: Riverman; Dam: Glaneuse (Snob)
 Owner: Jacques Wertheimer
 Breeder: Jacques Wertheimer

References

Prix de l'Arc de Triomphe
 1981
Prix de l'Arc de Triomphe
Prix de l'Arc de Triomphe
Prix de l'Arc de Triomphe